Serhiy Anatoliyovych Ivanov (born 21 January 1952, in Tokmak, Ukraine) is a Ukrainian politician.

In 2005-06 he served as a Governor of Sevastopol.

References

External links
 Serhiy Ivanov at the website of Ukrainian Police in the AR of Crimea.

1952 births
Living people
People from Tokmak
Tavrida National V.I. Vernadsky University alumni
Governors of Sevastopol (Ukraine)
Third convocation members of the Verkhovna Rada
Fourth convocation members of the Verkhovna Rada
Independent politicians in Ukraine
Recipients of the Honorary Diploma of the Cabinet of Ministers of Ukraine